The 12821 / 12822 Dhauli Express is a daily train service between Kolkata Shalimar in Howrah district of West Bengal and Puri in Odisha. This train has 20 coaches.

Train description 
The 2007 Odia language film Dhauli Express starring Samaresh Routray, Mihir Das and Aparajita Mohanty, Siddhanta Mahapatra, Hari  takes its name from the train. The train has an average speed of around 56km/h with halts, so it's ticket includes a superfast charge. The train runs jam-packed throughout the year. Earlier it used to run from Howrah Jn.

References

Rail transport in Howrah
Transport in Puri
Named passenger trains of India
Rail transport in Odisha
Rail transport in West Bengal
Express trains in India